Anicka Chabeli Arrieta Castañeda (born December 16, 1999) is a Filipina footballer who plays as a midfielder for Mount Druitt Town Rangers and the Philippines women's national team.

Personal life
Castañeda was born on December 16, 1999. She has a brother and an elder sister, Sara Castañeda, who is also a footballer and has played for the national team as well. She attended high school at De La Salle Zobel before moving to De La Salle University.

Career
Castañeda played for the women's junior futsal team of De La Salle Zobel. She was named junior MVP at the WNCAA in 2016. She was also the captain of the National Capital Region team that played at the secondary girls event of the 2017 Palarong Pambansa.

Castañeda was part of the Philippines women's national football team that played at the 2018 AFC Women's Asian Cup qualification in April 2017. The national squad secured qualification with one match to spare by drawing Bahrain 1–1. She scored for the national team in a prior match against Tajikistan. Castañeda was also part of the team that competed at the 2017 Southeast Asian Games.

After high school, Castañeda joined the women's team of the De La Salle University but has yet to feature in the UAAP since Season 80. She was unavailable for Season 80 due to national team commitments while an injury made her unavailable for Season 81. Season 82 was cancelled due to the COVID-19 pandemic.

She would play for the Philippines at the 2022 AFC Women's Asian Cup, helping her squad qualify for their first-ever FIFA Women's World Cup in 2023.

International goals
Scores and results list the Philippines' goal tally first.

Honours

International

Philippines
Southeast Asian Games third place: 2021
AFF Women's Championship: 2022

References

1999 births
Living people
People from Mandaluyong
Footballers from Metro Manila
Filipino women's footballers
Women's association football midfielders
Philippines women's international footballers
Competitors at the 2017 Southeast Asian Games
De La Salle University alumni
Southeast Asian Games bronze medalists for the Philippines
Southeast Asian Games medalists in football
Competitors at the 2021 Southeast Asian Games